The order Ostreida includes the true oysters. One superfamily (Ostreoidea) and two extant families are recognised within it. The two families are Ostreidae, the true oysters, and Gryphaeidae, the foam oysters.

2010 taxonomy
In 2010, a new proposed classification system for the Bivalvia was published by Bieler, Carter & Coan, revising the classification of the Bivalvia, including the order Ostreida.

References

External links

 European checklist of marine species, for Molluscs
 Man and Molluscs Bivalve page

 
Bivalve orders